Ara-zutsumi Dam is an earthfill dam located in Tokyo prefecture in Japan. The dam is used for irrigation. The catchment area of the dam is 0.8 km2. The dam impounds about   ha of land when full and can store 25 thousand cubic meters of water. The construction of the dam was started on 1933 and completed in 1934.

References

Dams in Tokyo Prefecture
1934 establishments in Japan